The 7th Vuelta a España (Tour of Spain), a long-distance bicycle stage race and one of the three grand tours, was held from 12 May to 5 June 1947. Emilio Rodríguez won the mountains classification.

Teams and riders

Route

Results

Final General Classification

References

 
1947
1947 in Spanish sport
1947 in road cycling